Godomilje is a village in the Bosnia and Herzegovina. According to the 1991 census, the village is located in the municipality of Rogatica.

References

Populated places in Rogatica